Mingo is an unincorporated community in northern Wayne Township, Champaign County, Ohio, United States.  It has a post office with the ZIP code 43047.  It is located along State Route 245.

Mingo was originally known as Mulberry, and under the latter name was platted in 1866. It was later renamed for the historic Iroquoian Mingo people.

References

Unincorporated communities in Champaign County, Ohio
Unincorporated communities in Ohio